Milena Usenik (born 9 September 1934) is a Slovenian athlete and artist. She competed in the women's shot put at the 1956 Summer Olympics and the 1960 Summer Olympics, representing Yugoslavia.

References

1934 births
Living people
Athletes (track and field) at the 1956 Summer Olympics
Athletes (track and field) at the 1960 Summer Olympics
Slovenian female shot putters
Slovenian women artists
Slovenian contemporary artists
Olympic athletes of Yugoslavia
Place of birth missing (living people)
Universiade silver medalists for Yugoslavia
Universiade medalists in athletics (track and field)
Medalists at the 1959 Summer Universiade